The Raiff Limestone is a geologic formation in Nevada. It preserves fossils dating back to the Cambrian period.

See also

 List of fossiliferous stratigraphic units in Nevada
 Paleontology in Nevada

References
 

Cambrian Nevada
Limestone formations of the United States
Cambrian System of North America
Geologic formations of Nevada